Stoic  is the third mixtape by American rapper and singer T-Pain, released on September 30, 2012. The mixtape features guest appearances from Tay Dizm, Pitbull, Nuke Nikelz, Doe Montana, Notty Black, Skye, Young Cash, Mistah Fab, Krizz Kaliko, Tech N9ne, Shay Mooney, Big K.R.I.T. and Travie McCoy.

Background
On August 22, 2012, T-Pain announced the mixtape during an interview with Yahoo Music, he explained that the Stoic mixtape features a surprising mixture of genres, saying: "It's basically an outlet for me, and it's so many different genres of music on this mixtape it's crazy," he said. "This is a collection of [the] kinds of things that's happening in my head, and I'm not going to show any remorse for putting all these genres together and just really hurting the world. I'm not trying to make an urban mixtape. I'm not trying to make a pop mixtape. I'm making a T-Pain mixtape."

T-Pain also explained the mixtape title reflects his need to vent, saying: "The mixtape is called Stoic that means a person that's able to take great amounts of pain without showing emotion. It's pretty much everything I'm trying to do, however I want to do it, this is just total freedom for me right now." T-Pain also explained the mixtapes lead single "Don't You Quit", saying: "You know me, I'm just all into motivation. That comes in all kinds of forms. So we just trying to venture out and make sure everybody get their piece of all of my motivation because I got a lot to give out. It's got to be an anthem."

Promotion
On August 22, 2012, the first song was released in promotion of the mixtape titled "Don’t You Quit". On September 27, 2012, the music video was released for "Don’t You Quit" On October 8, 2012, the music video was released for "Hang Ups".

Track listing

References

2012 mixtape albums
T-Pain albums
Albums produced by Maejor
Albums produced by Boi-1da
Albums produced by T-Minus (record producer)
Albums produced by T-Pain
Albums produced by Tha Bizness
Pop albums by American artists
Electronic albums by American artists